Stewart Owen Ford (born 1964) is a British businessman, the founder and chief executive (CEO) of the failed financial company Keydata Investment Services. He was fined a record £76 million by the Financial Conduct Authority in January 2019.

Early life
Stewart Owen Ford was born in 1964. He lived in Edinburgh until he was 17.

Career
Ford studied printing in London when he was 20. Afterwards, he went back to Edinburgh and started in business for himself. He had a career as a printer, publisher and then a financial services entrepreneur.

On 26 May 2015, it was announced that Ford had been fined a record £75 million by the Financial Conduct Authority (FCA). The FCA fine is in connection with the alleged mis-selling of £475 million of "death bonds", wrongly encouraging buyers to believe that they were entitled to tax-free ISAs. Ford is counter-suing the FCA for £370 million, claiming that the closure of Keydata was "politically motivated", that the company was a "highly successful" one with nearly £3 billion of assets under management, and that his reputation had sufferered "grievous and irreparable" harm.

According to Ford, the one-day Upper Tribunal case management hearing for his challenge to the FCA's decision to fine him £75 million has been set for 23 September 2015.

The decision of the Upper Tribunal was handed down on 6 November 2018 with Judge Berner finding for the Respondent (the FCA) and accepting their request to increase the fine to £76 million.

References

1964 births
Living people
British chief executives